Lorna Doorman (born 15 April 1998) is a Zimbabwean swimmer. She competed in the women's 200 metre freestyle event at the 2018 FINA World Swimming Championships (25 m), in Hangzhou, China.

References

External links
 

1998 births
Living people
Zimbabwean female freestyle swimmers
Place of birth missing (living people)